Gopalpur is a census town in the Kanksa CD block in the Durgapur subdivision of the Paschim Bardhaman district in the Indian state of West Bengal.

Geography

Location

Arra, Bamunara, Gopalpur and Amlajora form a cluster of census towns in the western portion of Kanksa CD block.

Urbanisation
According to the 2011 census, 79.22% of the population of the Durgapur subdivision was urban and 20.78% was rural. The sole municipal corporation in Durgapur subdivision is located at Durgapur and the subdivision has 38 (+1 partly) census towns (partly presented in the map alongside; all places marked on the map are linked in the full-screen map).

Demographics
According to the 2011 Census of India, Gopalpur had a total population of 15,967 of which 8,126 (51%) were males and 7,841 (49%) were females. Population in the age range 0–6 years was 1,735. The total number of literates in Gopalpur was 11,405 (80.14% of the population over 6 years).

Infrastructure

According to the District Census Handbook 2011, Bardhaman, Gopalpur covered an area of 14.1196 km2. Among the civic amenities, it had 24 km roads with open drain, the protected water-supply involved overhead tank, tap water from treated sources, hand pump. It had 2,000 domestic electric connections. Among the medical facilities it had 2 dispensary/ health centres, 1 family welfare centre, 2 medicine shops. Among the educational facilities it had were 15 primary schools, 3 middle schools, 2 secondary schools, 2 senior secondary schools. It had 3 non-formal education centres (Sarva Shiksha Abhiyan). Among the social, recreational, cultural facilities it had 1 public library and 1 reading room. Among the important commodities it produced were rice, biri, salpata thala. It had the branch office of 1 nationalised bank.

Education
Gopalpur High School is a coeducational higher secondary school established in 1854. It has arrangements for teaching from Class V to XII. The subjects taught are: Bengali, English, history, political science, geography, eco-geography, mathematics, physics, chemistry and bio science.

Birudiha High School at Gopalpur Uttarpara is a coeducational high school with arrangements for teaching from Class VI to X. It was established in 1960.

References

Cities and towns in Paschim Bardhaman district